Kurt David Petersen (born June 17, 1957 in St. Louis, Missouri) is a former American football guard in the National Football League for the Dallas Cowboys. He played college football at the University of Missouri.

Early years
Petersen attended Lutheran High School North in St. Louis, Missouri. 

He accepted a football scholarship from the University of Missouri. He was named a starter at "stand-up" defensive end as a sophomore. The next year, he registered 53 tackles (9 for losses). He played a key role in the season opener upset against the University of Notre Dame, when he teamed with linebacker Chris Garlich to stop running back Vagas Ferguson  on fourth-down at the Tigers one-yard line.

As a senior, he was moved to defensive tackle as a senior, when he was also selected as a team co-captain. He posted 63 tackles and 4 fumble recoveries (tied for the team lead).

Professional career
Petersen was selected by the Dallas Cowboys in the fourth round (105th overall) of the 1980 NFL Draft, with the intention of playing him on the offensive line. As a rookie, the offense needed help and like defensive players Blaine Nye and Pat Donovan before him, he was converted into an offensive lineman.

In 1981 he was named the starting right guard, after Robert Shaw went down with a career ending knee injury in the second game, that required previous starter Tom Rafferty to play center.

In 1982, he started all games during a strike shortened season, receiving second-team All-Pro honors. The next year, he missed 2 games with a back injury.

In 1984, he missed 3 games with an injury. On August 19, 1986, he was placed on the injured reserve list after suffering a serious left knee injury that would eventually forced him into early retirement. On September 1, 1987, he was placed on the injured reserve list for a second year in a row with the same injury.

After not being able to fully recover, he retired on February 2, 1988.

Personal life
Petersen currently works as a Financial Advisor.

References

1957 births
Living people
Players of American football from St. Louis
American football offensive guards
Missouri Tigers football players
Dallas Cowboys players